Events from the year 1869 in Russia.

Incumbents
 Monarch – Alexander II

Events

 Aktobe
 Amvrosiivka
 Donetsk
 Dzhevanshirsky Uyezd
 Lazarevskoye Microdistrict
 Raduń Yeshiva
 Lanskaya railway station

Births

 January 21 – Grigori Rasputin, mystic (d. 1916)
 February 26 – Nadezhda Krupskaya, Marxist revolutionary, Vladimir Lenin's wife (d. 1939)
 June 7 – Grand Duke Alexander Alexandrovich of Russia (d. 1870)

Deaths

References

1869 in Russia
Years of the 19th century in the Russian Empire